Nessel is a surname. Notable people with the surname include:

 Carl Nessel (born 1947), aka Coach, fire fighter and poker winner in the 2004 Casino Employees Championship
 Dana Nessel (born 1969), American politician, Attorney General of Michigan
 John Nessel (born 1952), American football player

See also
 Nessel Township, Chisago County, Minnesota
 Nesselrode

German-language surnames